15 Canis Majoris is a variable star in the southern constellation of Canis Major, located roughly 1,200 light years away from the Sun. It has the variable star designation EY Canis Majoris; 15 Canis Majoris is the Flamsteed designation. The star is visible to the naked eye as a faint, blue-white hued star with a baseline apparent visual magnitude of +4.82. It is moving away from the Earth with a heliocentric radial velocity of 28 km/s.

This is a B-type supergiant star with a stellar classification of B1 Ib. The star has 12.8 times the mass of the Sun and 6.8 times the Sun's radius. It is radiating 20,000 times the luminosity of the Sun from its photosphere at an effective temperature of 26,100 K.

References

B-type supergiants
Beta Cephei variables
Canis Major
BD-20 1616
Canis Majoris, 15
050707
033092
2571
Canis Majoris, EY